The White Lion is a public house in St Albans, Hertfordshire, England. In 2015 the pub was owned by Punch Taverns.

Architecture
The building is said to date from the end of the sixteenth century. It is timber framed with a slightly jettied first floor, although the timber-framing is not evident from the street as it has been refaced. 
It is listed Grade II with Historic England.

References

External links
 http://www.whitelionstalbans.co.uk/about-us/ website

Pubs in St Albans
Grade II listed pubs in Hertfordshire
Timber framed buildings in Hertfordshire